Philip (15 March 1720 – 18 July 1765) was Duke of Parma from 18 October 1748 until his death in 1765. He was born a Spanish infante, being the second son of King Philip V and Elisabeth Farnese. The Duchy of Parma had been ruled by the House of Farnese, Queen Elisabeth's family. Philip founded the House of Bourbon-Parma, a cadet line of the House of Bourbon. He was a first cousin and son-in-law of the French king Louis XV.

Life
Born at the Royal Alcazar in Madrid as Felipe de Borbón y Farnesio, he was the third child and second son of Philip V of Spain and his wife, Elisabeth Farnese.

He was raised in Madrid and as a child showed more interest in art than in politics. He was also the 12th Count of Chinchón and Grandee of Spain First Class with a coat of arms of Bourbon after the alienation with royal authorization in 1738 of the 11th Count of Chinchón, Don Jose Sforza-Cesarini, Duke of Canzano, a title he later ceded to his brother Louis in 1754.

His mother came from the family of Farnese, which had ruled the Duchy of Parma, Piacenza and Guastalla for many generations. The duchy had been ruled between 1731 and 1736 by his elder brother Charles, but was exchanged with Austria for The Two Sicilies after the War of Polish Succession. Twelve years later, in the Treaty of Aix-la-Chapelle (1748), Austria lost the duchy and Philip became the new duke, founding the House of Bourbon-Parma.

As part of the Second Treaty of Versailles (1757) between Austria and France, it was intended that Philip would become king of the Southern Netherlands in a deal that would see French troops occupy key positions in the country – however this arrangement was repudiated by the subsequent Third Treaty of Versailles and Philip continued in Parma.

The Duchy of Parma was ruined by many years of warfare, and in 1759 Philip named the able Frenchman Guillaume du Tillot as his minister to restore the economy. Philip was an enlightened ruler who stimulated education and philosophy, attracting personalities like Étienne Bonnot de Condillac and Alexandre Deleyre.

Marriage

Philip married his first cousin once removed Princess Louise Élisabeth of France in Alcalá de Henares, Spain on 25 October 1739. They had the following children:

Isabella Luisa Antonietta Ferdinanda Giuseppina Saveria Dominica Giovanna of Parma (31 December 1741 – 27 November 1763) – she married Marie Antoinette's older brother, the Austrian emperor, Joseph II. She had issue, but all her children died in childhood.
Ferdinando Maria Filippo Lodovico Sebastiano Francesco Giacomo of Parma (20 January 1751 – 9 October 1802)) – he succeeded his father as Duke of Parma in 1765 and married his older sister's sister-in-law, Archduchess Maria Amalia of Austria. He left issue.
Luisa Maria Teresa Ana of Parma (9 December 1751 – 2 January 1819) – she was known as Maria Luisa. She was Queen of Spain as the wife of her cousin, Charles IV of Spain. She left issue.
Their marriage was an unhappy one, and Louise Elisabeth died of smallpox at the age of 32 in 1759. 
Philip died unexpectedly on 18 July 1765 in Alessandria,  Sardinia, after having accompanied his daughter Maria Luisa on her way to Genoa, where she sailed for Spain to marry Infante Charles. Through Philip's daughter Maria Luisa, he is an ancestor of the Bourbons of Spain, the Bourbons of the Two Sicilies, and the House of Orléans.

Honours
 : Knight of the Order of the Holy Spirit (22 March 1736)

Ancestors

Heraldry

References

House of Bourbon-Parma
Dukes of Parma
Dukes of Guastalla
Princes of Parma and Piacenza
Spanish infantes
Knights of the Golden Fleece of Spain
18th-century Spanish people
Spanish generals
1720 births
1765 deaths
House of Bourbon
Spanish people of the War of the Austrian Succession
Burials at the Sanctuary of Santa Maria della Steccata
Grandees of Spain
Sons of kings